Ranasinghe Pattikirikoralalage Aruna Hemantha Wickramaratne (born 21 February 1971), or Hemantha Wickramaratne, is a former Sri Lankan cricketer who played three One Day Internationals in 1993. He made his Twenty20 debut on 17 August 2004, for Sinhalese Sports Club in the 2004 SLC Twenty20 Tournament. In November 2018, he was named on Sri Lanka Cricket's National Selection Panel.

References

External links 

1971 births
Living people
Basnahira North cricketers
Basnahira South cricketers
Sinhalese Sports Club cricketers
Sri Lanka One Day International cricketers
Sri Lankan cricketers
Ruhuna cricketers